The Adventures of Cyclops and Phoenix was a four-issue comic book mini-series written by Scott Lobdell, drawn by Gene Ha, and published by American company Marvel Comics in 1994. It revealed much of the back story for the character Cable, much of which had been implied before, but was still shrouded in mystery and uncertainty. The series' title characters are two of the founding members of the X-Men, a group of superpowered mutants dedicated to confronting the bigotry that afflicts their people, and stopping mutants with evil motives. They have regular adventures which fall into almost every subgenre of science fiction imaginable, including frequent encounters with time travel.

Holocaust's name was mentioned by Apocalypse in issue #4, a year before the character made its first actual appearance (first referred in Stryfe's Strike Files) in the "Age of Apocalypse" story arc.

Back story
Shortly after Jean Grey (Phoenix) was believed dead, Cyclops (her longtime love interest, real name Scott Summers) met a woman who was almost her exact duplicate named Madelyne Pryor. Unbeknownst to either of them at the time, Madelyne Pryor was a clone of Jean Grey, created by Mister Sinister. Sinister was given vast powers by the virtually immortal mutant Apocalypse, but he feared Apocalypse's power and began to investigate a means to defeat him. He discovered that the combination of Summers and Grey's DNA would produce a mutant of sufficient power to do this. With Jean Grey apparently dead, and Sinister for some reason unable to combine their DNA artificially, he created Madelyne Pryor and positioned her to make contact with Cyclops. His plan worked: the two married and had a child, whom they named Nathan Christopher Summers.

Some time later, Jean Grey was revealed to be alive, and her reappearance led to a series of events that caused Madelyne Pryor to become insane and eventually kill herself (as told in the Inferno crossover). The baby was left in the care of Cyclops and Jean, who were now part of the group X-Factor.

Shortly after, X-Factor had an encounter with Apocalypse in X-Factor #68, and the villain infected the young baby with a Techno-Organic virus. The virus was rapidly converting his body into a machine, and had already consumed one of his arms. Unsure of what to do, at that moment a mysterious woman calling herself Askani appeared in front of them. She revealed that she was from the distant future, and had the means to save the child, but it would mean that they would likely never see him again. In reality, the child grew up to be the mutant Cable who had journeyed back into the past and who had appeared a few months before this event in New Mutants #87.

Plot
The series takes place shortly after the wedding of Cyclops and Jean Grey in X-Men #30, some time after the events of X-Factor #68 (approximately 3 years in real time, but perhaps only a year or less in the timeline of the comic books).

During their honeymoon, their time-lost alternate daughter, Rachel Summers who is then the Mother Askani, brought them into the future. Their physical bodies were left behind, but their minds were brought into two bodies waiting for them in the future. These bodies, very similar to the ones they had left behind, had weaker versions of their original powers. They were reunited with their son, and were given the opportunity to raise him in this bleak future that was ruled by Apocalypse.

Prior to their arrival, the Mother Askani and the Askani clan attempted to save the baby Nathan from the TO virus. They first cloned the baby, fearing that they would fail in their efforts to save the original. They succeeded, however, and were left with two babies. The healthy clone baby was kidnapped by Apocalypse's forces to be raised by the villain, and was named Stryfe. Apocalypse thought the baby was the original, and had somehow survived the TO virus. Seeing this as a sign of strength (and his own body deteriorating), Apocalypse planned to transfer his essence into the young Stryfe once he reached maturity.

The original baby was left behind, and was raised by Cyclops and Phoenix. As he began to grow, they protected him, and began to train him in the use of his vast, burgeoning telepathic powers, particularly how to use his telekenesis to keep the still present TO virus at bay. Their identity as his true parents (at least, genetically in Jean Grey's case) was kept a secret, and they instead went by the names Slym and Redd (these refer to Slim, a nickname Cyclops had picked up his younger years due to his slender frame, and Red, a common nickname for people with red hair, which Jean has sometimes been referred to over years, usually by Wolverine).

All together, they spent 12 years raising Nathan Summers, who never knew they were his true parents. When the Mother Askani eventually died, their minds were brought back to their physical bodies, just after a combined effort of Slym, Redd and Nate finally defeating Apocalypse.

Sequels 
The Adventures of Cyclops and Phoenix was followed up by two other mini-series, Askani'son and The Further Adventures of Cyclops and Phoenix. Askani'son chronicled Cable's teenage years after Redd and Slym left, and his further struggles to become a man. The Further Adventures of Cyclops and Phoenix sees the two once again misplaced in time, this time back to the turn of the century, to be witness to the origin of Mister Sinister.

Collected editions
A trade paperback was produced some time after the mini-series finished publication collecting it into one volume. However, it was produced during a period of economic decline for Marvel, and before trades had reached the popularity they would a few years later, and has thus been left out of print.

In 2014, the miniseries was collected along with two other miniseries that continue the young Cable side of the story Askani'son and X-Men: Phoenix.

In 2018, the miniseries was collected into a single paperback along with The Further Adventures of Cyclops and Phoenix.

Cyclops & Phoenix series

Notes

References

Comics about time travel